Koninklijke Voetbalclub Oostende, also called KV Oostende or KVO, is a Belgian football club from the city of Ostend, West Flanders in Belgium. The team was founded in 1904 as VG Oostende and has the matricule No. 31.

History

In 1911, another club was created, AS Oostende, which would soon become the best club of the city, playing regularly in the second division in the 1930s. In the mid 1970s, AS reached the first division while VG was playing at the second level.

The two clubs merged in 1981 to become KV Oostende. The new club played in the third division for eleven years, before finally being promoted. In its first season on the second level, Oostende were immediately promoted again, to the first division, where it would achieve its best result in the club history: a seventh place, in 1993–94.

From 1995 to 2013, Oostende played in the second division, except in 1998–99 and 2004–05, when it was at the higher level again, and in 2001–02 and 2002–03, when it played in the third division.

In 1982, one year after the merger, VG Oostende had been re-founded at the lowest level of the Belgian football competition. The club first used the Armenonville stadium, which was the original ground of VG. In 2001, the stadium was declared unsafe, so the club had to groundshare with KV Oostende in the Albertparkstadion, until 2010. In 2013, the new VG Oostende also disappeared, after a financial breakdown.

In August 2013, shortly after a new promotion to the highest level, it was announced that chairman and majority shareholder Yves Lejaeghere would be succeeded by a new chairman, businessman Marc Coucke.

In the spring of 2016, the main tribune of the Albertparkstadion was rebuilt and the stadium was renamed the Versluys Arena with the capacity increased to 8,432.

Thanks to its success in the previous campaign, Oostende played in the third qualifying round of the Europa League in the 2017/18 season. The team drew Olympique de Marseille, a club with an important place in the history of French and European football. Oostende was unable to go any further in the competition after losing 4-2 in Marseille on 17 July 2017 and only securing a goalless draw at home on 3 August 2017. While Oostende were clear underdogs, the KVO supporters filled the visitor section of the Stade Vélodrome in Marseille, proud of the team's qualification after having only been promoted to Belgium's first division a few years ago. Olympique de Marseille would go on to reach the finals in the Europa league that season, falling short to Atlético Madrid.

After a disappointing beginning to the 2017/18 season, manager Yves Vanderhaeghe was set free of his obligations, with the assistant manager, Adnan Čustović, being asked to take over.

In December 2017 Marc Coucke announced that he would be leaving, after recently purchasing R.S.C. Anderlecht. It was then announced on 8 February 2018 that Peter Callant would replace Coucke as chairman. Coucke confirmed his continued interest in the club and that he remained a fan and would stay on as a minority shareholder.

In May 2020 an investment group acquired   KV Oostende Football Club and the new investors include Pacific Media Group, Chien Lee, Partners Path Capital and Krishen Sud.

Honours
Belgian Cup:
Runners-up: 2016–17
Belgian Second Division:
Winners (2): 1997–98, 2012–13
Belgian Second Division Final Round:
Winners (2): 1992–93, 2003–04

Current squad

Out on loan

Club Officials

Managers
 Han Grijzenhout (1981–82)
 Nedeljko Bulatović (1982–84)
 Luc Sanders (1986–87)
 Dennis van Wijk (30 September 1996 – 30 June 1998)
 Jean-Marie Pfaff (1 October 1998 – 4 February 1999)
 Leo Van der Elst (1999–00)
 Kenneth Brylle (1 July 2001 – 30 June 2003)
 Gilbert Bodart (17 May 2003 – 10 January 2005)
 Mohsen Akhondi (13 January 2005 – 30 June 2005)
 Willy Wellens (1 July 2006–07)
 Dennis van Wijk (20 November 2007 – 10 December 2007)
 Kurt Bataille (interim) (11 December 2007 – 30 June 2008)
 Jean-Pierre Vande Velde (1 July 2008 – 4 March 2009)
 Thierry Pister (3 March 2009 – 14 February 2011)
 Frederik Vanderbiest (16 February 2011–15)
 Yves Vanderhaeghe (2015–2017)
 Adnan Čustović (interim) (17 September 2017 –17 October 2017)
 Adnan Čustović (17 October 2017 – 30 June 2018)
 Gert Verheyen (2018–2019)
 Kåre Ingebrigtsen (2019)
 Dennis van Wijk (31 December 2019 – 2 March 2020)
 Adnan Čustović (4 March 2020 – 7 June 2020)
 Alexander Blessin (7 June 2020 – 19 January 2022)

References

External links

 

 
Association football clubs established in 1904
Football clubs in Belgium
1904 establishments in Belgium
Organisations based in Belgium with royal patronage
K.V. Oostende
Belgian Pro League clubs